Gilbert House may refer to:

in the Falkland Islands
 Gilbert House (Falkland Islands), the premises of the Legislative Council of the Falkland Islands, in Stanley

in the United States (by state then city)

Gilbert House, a Los Angeles Historic-Cultural Monument within Alvarado Terrace Historic District, Los Angeles, California
Jeremiah S. Gilbert House, Atlanta, Georgia
Henry Gilbert House, Kalamazoo, Michigan
Giles Gilbert House, Stanton, Michigan
Horace Gilbert House, Swartz Creek, Michigan
Newington Gilbert House, Afton, Minnesota
Elisha Gilbert House, New Lebanon, New York
Northrup-Gilbert House, Phoenix, New York
Philip E. Gilbert Houses, Dayton, Ohio, listed on the National Register of Historic Places (NRHP)
Jane Gilbert House, Madison, Ohio, listed on the NRHP
F. A. Gilbert House, Mansfield, Ohio, listed on the NRHP
Gilbert House (Worthington, Ohio)
Rev. William S. Gilbert House, Astoria, Oregon, listed on the NRHP
Andrew T. Gilbert House, part of A. C. Gilbert's Discovery Village in Salem, Oregon
J.B. Gilbert House, Hartsville, South Carolina
Page-Gilbert House, Austin, Texas
Samuel and Julia Gilbert House, Farmers Branch, Texas, listed on the NRHP
H. M. Gilbert House, Yakima, Washington, listed on the NRHP
John and Flora Gilbert House, Oregon, Wisconsin

See also
Gilbert Building (disambiguation)
 McGilbert House, Lufkin, Texas